Novoufimsk (Yañı Öfö) is a rural locality (a village) in Maysky Selsoviet, Iglinsky District, Bashkortostan, Russia. The population was 22 as of 2010. There is 1 street.

Geography 
Novoufimsk is located 77 km northeast of Iglino (the district's administrative centre) by road. Uk is the nearest rural locality.

References 

Rural localities in Iglinsky District